Las Chivas Rayadas (English: The Striped Goats) is a 1964 Mexican film. It stars Sara García and Antonio Espino "Clavillazo".

The story is a kind-of homage to the football team CD Guadalajara, where the youngest brother of three (Clavillazo) wants to fulfill his dream of playing for the Chivas, while helping his older brother improve his career as a goalkeeper and his other brother, a priest, to have chances as a luchador and as a bullfighter, all in the eyes of their strict mother (Sara Garcia).

External links
 

1964 films
Mexican action comedy films
1960s Spanish-language films
1960s Mexican films
Mexican sports comedy films